Rabil   is a town on the island of Boa Vista, Cape Verde. It was the island's former capital. Its population was 1,248 in 2010. The island's airport, Aristides Pereira International Airport, is situated northwest of the town.

Geography

The river Ribeira do Rabil flows past the town. The wetlands around its mouth are an Important Bird Area. The beach Praia da Chave has been developed for tourism.

See also
List of cities and towns in Cape Verde
Tourism in Cape Verde

References

Geography of Boa Vista, Cape Verde
Towns in Cape Verde